Homewood is a city in southeastern Jefferson County, Alabama, United States.  It is a suburb of Birmingham, located on the other side of Red Mountain due south of the city center. As of the 2010 census its population was 25,167, and in 2019 the estimated population was 25,377.

History

Early history and development 
The first settlers of the area which would eventually become Homewood arrived in the early 1800s. The area's population, however, did not grow significantly until Birmingham suffered a major cholera epidemic in 1873 (See Timeline of Birmingham, Alabama).

Speculators soon began buying up land and developing communities in the countryside surrounding Birmingham. Many of the smaller communities which would eventually become Homewood were developed during this time period, including Rosedale, Grove Park, Edgewood, and Oak Grove.

Edgewood saw the greatest amount of development. The community contained an Electric Railway leading to downtown Birmingham by 1911 and a man-made lake by 1915. The lake was created by the construction of a dam along Shades Creek near Columbiana Road. Two parallel roads were graded on either side of the lake with the intention of creating a race track around the lake, however these plans never came to fruition. The roads eventually became Lakeshore Drive and South Lakeshore Drive.

Incorporation 
In 1926, a local attorney named Charles Rice started a movement to merge several of the communities surrounding Birmingham. In September of the same year, Rosedale, Edgewood, and Grove Park voted to incorporate under the name Homewood. The city of Hollywood, Alabama was annexed into Homewood in 1929.

In 1955, Oak Grove was also annexed into Homewood.

Great Depression and World War II 
The Great Depression and a polio epidemic, which sickened 80 children in Homewood, greatly damaged Homewood's economy and social landscape.

The regional economy picked up after the outbreak of World War II and the accompanying steel boom in Birmingham, where production ramped up in order to contribute to the war effort.

During the 1940s, Homewood's police and fire departments doubled in size to accommodate a 73.9 percent increase in the city's population from 1940 to 1950.

Civil rights era 
In 1959, Homewood voters defeated a move by Birmingham to annex the city. A second attempt supposedly succeeded in July 1964, but voting irregularities and lawsuits prevented the outcome of that election in the courts until September 9, 1966, when the Alabama Supreme Court ruled the 1964 vote null and void (See "City of Birmingham v. Bouldin"). In a special election on December 13, 1966, a vote for annexation failed with 65 percent of Homewood residents voting against the annexation.

Homewood avoided the worst of the turmoil associated with the Civil Rights Movement and, more specifically, the Southern Christian Leadership Conference's 1963 Birmingham campaign. However, in September 1963, the Shades Valley Sun newspaper reported on a racially motivated bombing on Central Avenue in Rosedale.

In 1970, Homewood created its own school system, breaking away from the Jefferson County school system. The new Homewood High School opened in December 1972.

Hollywood
Hollywood is a former town annexed into Homewood, Alabama, in 1929. A historic district of much of the area is listed on the National Register of Historic Places as Hollywood Historic District.  The district is roughly bounded by U.S. Highway 31, U.S. Highway 280, and Lakeshore Drive and is significant for the Mission Revival and Spanish Colonial Revival architectural style of surviving houses and other buildings.

Clyde Nelson began developing Hollywood Boulevard as a residential subdivision in 1926. He employed a sales force of 75, armed with the memorable slogan "Out of the Smoke Zone, Into the Ozone", to entice Birmingham residents over Red Mountain. Architect George P. Turner designed many of the new homes in the Spanish Colonial Revival architecture, which had become fashionably linked with the glamour of Hollywood, California in the early days of the motion picture industry there. Turner also nodded to the English Tudor style which was already widespread in Birmingham and over the mountain.

The Hollywood Country Club on Lakeshore Drive (destroyed in 1984 by fire) and the American Legion Post 134 (originally Hollywood's Town Hall) were also built at this time.

In order to support his new development, Nelson created the area's first autobus line and extended the first natural gas pipeline into Shades Valley.

Hollywood incorporated as a town on January 14, 1927 with Clarence Lloyd as its first and only mayor. The town was annexed into Homewood on October 14, 1929. The Great Depression virtually ended development of the subdivision.

In 2002, the Hollywood Historic District was registered with the National Register of Historic Places, and is home to The American Institute of Architects (AIA)-nominated houses like 11 Bonita Drive.  The listing includes 412 contributing buildings and one contributing site, over a  area.

Geography
Homewood is located at  (33.468306, -86.808146).

The city, along with the rest of Jefferson County, lies atop iron, coal, and limestone deposits.

Shades Creek, which is part of the Cahaba River system, runs through Homewood.

Demographics

2000 census
At the 2000 census, there were 25,043 people, 10,688 households, and 5,878 families living in the city. The racial makeup of the city was 79.75% White, 15.30% Black or African-American, 0.20% Native American, 2.57% Asian, 0.03% Pacific Islander, 1.00% from other races, and 1.16% from two or more races. 2.80% of the population were Hispanic or Latino of any race.

Of the 10,688 households 27.2% had children under the age of 18 living with them, 41.0% were married couples living together, 11.4% had a female householder with no husband present, and 45.0% were non-families. 36.2% of households were one person and 9.4% were one person aged 65 or older. The average household size was 2.16 and the average family size was 2.87.

The age distribution was 20.3% under the age of 18, 17.8% from 18 to 24, 34.0% from 25 to 44, 17.3% from 45 to 64, and 10.6% 65 or older. The median age was 30 years. For every 100 females, there were 86.0 males. For every 100 females age 18 and over, there were 81.9 males.

The median household income was $55,431 and the median family income  was $70,256. Males had a median income of $40,969 versus $34,694 for females. The per capita income for the city was $25,491. About 4.4% of families and 7.6% of the population were below the poverty line, including 4.5% of those under age 18 and 4.3% of those age 65 or over.

2010 census
At the 2010 census, there were 25,167 people, 10,092 households, and 5,760 families living in the city. The racial makeup of the city was 69.696% White, 17.3% Black or African-American, 0.2% Native American, 2.2% Asian, 0.0% Pacific Islander, 5,000% from other races, and 1.4% from two or more races. 7.3% of the population were Hispanic or Latino of any race.

Of the 10,092 households 30.1% had children under the age of 18 living with them, 41.3% were married couples living together, 12.2% had a female householder with no husband present, and 42.9% were non-families. 34.4% of households were one person and 9.9% were one person aged 65 or older. The average household size was 2.31 and the average family size was 3.02.

The age distribution was 22.8% under the age of 18, 17.4% from 18 to 24, 30.8% from 25 to 44, 19.9% from 45 to 64, and 9.1% 65 or older. The median age was 29.8 years. For every 100 females, there were 88.2 males. For every 100 females age 18 and over, there were 86.3 males.

The median family income  was $78,252. Males had a median income of $50,163 versus $41,023 for females. The per capita income for the city was $30,601. About 5.1% of families and 10.1% of the population were below the poverty line, including 6.9% of those under age 18 and 5.6% of those age 65 or over.

2020 census

As of the 2020 United States census, there were 26,414 people, 9,566 households, and 5,866 families residing in the city.

Schools

Public schools
The Homewood City School System is made up of five schools, including three elementary schools, one middle school and one high school:
 Shades Cahaba Elementary School
 Edgewood Elementary School
 Hall Kent Elementary School
 Homewood Middle School
 Homewood High School

Colleges and universities
 Samford University

Parks

 Patriot Park
 Homewood Central Park
 West Homewood Park
 Woodland Park
 Overton Park
 Spring Park
 Homewood Soccer Park

Notable people

 Ameer Abdullah, American football running back
 Mary Anderson (1918–2014), actress
 Paul DeMarco, lawyer and former Alabama State Representative
 Aaron Ernest, sprinter
 Katy Freels, professional soccer midfielder
 Charles Ghigna, children's author
 Evan Mathis, former American football offensive lineman
 Ronald Nored, National Basketball Association assistant coach
 Eric Ramsey, former American football player
 Samantha Shaw, former State Auditor of Alabama
 Luther Strange, U.S. Senator
 William C. Thompson, Presiding Judge, Alabama Court of Civil Appeals

See also
 Birmingham, Alabama

References

General
 Baggett, James L. (April 2004) "Homewood: The Life of a City." Alabama Review.

External links
 Official website of the City of Homewood
 Official website of the Homewood Chamber of Commerce
 Encyclopedia of Alabama: Homewood

Cities in Alabama
Cities in Jefferson County, Alabama
Birmingham metropolitan area, Alabama